The Report Card is a children's novel by Andrew Clements, first published in 2004. The story is narrated by a 5th-grade girl, Nora Rose Rowley. Nora is secretly a genius but does not tell anyone for fear that she will be thought of as "different".

Plot summary
9 year old Nora is not a normal child, and she figures this out as a little kid.  To disguise her intellect, Nora observes and emulates her classmates so she doesn't stand out.  She becomes interested in one of her schoolfellow, Stephen, and they become friends.  When their CMT (Connecticut Mastery Test) scores come out, Stephen's low scores persuade him that he is stupid as students start treating the scores as a competition reflecting their intelligence.  To encourage Stephen and prove the CMT scores are not important, Nora deliberately gets a bad report card: all D's except for a C in spelling.
 
Due to all the D's that Nora gets, her parents contact the school, and Nora starts to receive special attention. Soon, Nora reveals to Stephen that she is actually a genius and he comes up with a plan to prove grades don't reflect everything about a student.  He intentionally tells the school's gossip, Jenny Ashton that Nora is a genius.  As word spreads, Nora begins to act like a snob and challenges teachers by bringing up topics that have not been taught in class yet.  When she is confronted by the principal, Ms. Hackney, the next day for scoring a zero on her last three tests, Nora explains that she loathes grades because they cause too much competition.  She stays home the next day, pretending to be indisposed, but gives up her ploy when she discovers that Stephen has started a campaign for all students to rebel by scoring zeros on their next tests.
 
During an emergency school meeting, Stephen and Nora apologize on behalf of the involved students before the whole school.  Nora expresses that she thinks grades cause too much competition,  and that it causes the extra smart kids to be all snobbish and stuck-up, and the normal kids to think they're dumb.  Mrs. Byrne supports Nora, saying that she did think grades were getting too much heed.

Characters
 Nora Rose Rowley: The main character of the story and secretive genius. Her appearance is described as being short with reddish-blond hair. Researching is her favorite hobby. She was so intelligent by kindergarten that she taught herself to understand Spanish by watching the Univision channel and also to read National Geographic at 2 and a half. Nora loves astronomy, Latin, archaeology, soccer, etc. Her mother describes Nora as thoughtful, kind and caring. She has two siblings: Anne (6 years older) and Todd (3 years older). Her best friend is Stephen, who has average intelligence but still gets better grades than Nora in the beginning.
 Stephen Curtis: Nora's best friend. His self-confidence is poor due to low CMT. His favorite subject is English. He has never said one mean or angry thing. He got a higher grade than Nora in everything because Nora purposely had failed in everything. He was said to be a good friend, but forgets about her when some of his other friends come by.
 Ms. Hackney: The principal at Nora's school. She is one of the people in the meeting to explain her low grades, and was deeply upset by her getting three 0s in a row later in the story.
 Mrs. Byrne: The librarian at Philbrook Elementary School. She was one of the first to find out about Nora's unusually high intelligence and played a large role in carrying out her plan. She was equally unhappy about the competition for grades.
 Dr. Trindler: The guidance counselor who gave her an IQ test. He was the second one to discover her increased academic abilities.  
 Ms. Noyes: Nora's Social Studies and English teacher
 Mrs. Zhang: Nora's science and math teacher.
 Mr. Rowley: Nora's dad, who expects great grades no lower than a B
 Mrs. Rowley: Nora's mom who also expects great grades for all her children
 Mr.Todd Rowley: Nora's older brother. He is said to get low grades and show little concern. He is 3 years older than Nora.
 Miss. Anne Rowley: Nora's older sister. She was said to get perfect grades, and is in band. She is 6 years older than Nora. She is said to be intense and always wants to be in the spotlight.

References 

2004 American novels
Books by Andrew Clements
American children's novels
Novels set in elementary and primary schools
2004 children's books
Aladdin Paperbacks books